The Vialaeaceae are a family of fungi in the Ascomycota and class Sordariomycetes. In 2018, it was placed in the order Amphisphaeriales.

This is a monotypic taxon, containing the single genus Vialaea. The family of Vialaeaceae was named by P.F. Cannon in 1995. Pier Andrea Saccardo circumscribed the genus in Bull. Soc. Mycol. France vol.12 n page 66 in 1896.

The genus name of Vialaea is in honour of Pierre Viala (1859–1936), who was a French scientist. 

Species in the family are distributed in both temperate and tropical areas of the world, where they grow parasitically on twigs.

Species
As accepted by Species Fungorum;
 Vialaea bambusae 
 Vialaea insculpta 
 Vialaea mangiferae 
 Vialaea minutella 

Former species; V. ingae  = Diatractium ingae, Phyllachoraceae family

References

Sordariomycetes
Ascomycota families